This is a list of professional wrestling memorial shows from the 1980s until the present day. Memorial shows have been historically important in the history of professional wrestling, usually held in memory of a recently deceased wrestler, promoter or other well-known personality, and used to pay tribute to a particular individual's accomplishments and contributions to the industry. The proceeds are generally donated to family members or charitable organizations.

These shows were often held as a form of supercard, a major wrestling event not aired on pay-per-view, and sometimes resulted interpromotional shows. These types of shows were rarely seen in the United States, the earliest being the Von Erich Memorial Parade of Champions held in memory of David Von Erich from 1984–1988, but have been common in Japan since the late 1980s. In North America, memorial shows are most often held by independent wrestling promotions although mainstream organizations like WWE have occasionally dedicated specific episodes of WWE Raw to then current WWE wrestlers such as Owen Hart (1999), Eddie Guerrero (2005), and Chris Benoit (2007), and All Elite Wrestling on AEW Dynamite to then current AEW wrestler Brodie Lee (2020).

List

1980s

1990s

2000s

2010s

2020s

References

Memorial Showns